Snow machine may refer to:

Snowcat, a large vehicle with tracks, for grooming of snow or transport over it
Snowmobile, a small vehicle for individual transport (the primary meaning of the term in Alaska)
Snowmaking equipment, primarily an outdoor snow cannon with fan and compressor
Fake snow machines, usually for indoors, often producing soap bubbles
Snowblower for snow removal from walkways and driveways, or from roads and rail tracks